John Cessna (June 29, 1821 – December 13, 1893) was a Republican member of the U.S. House of Representatives from Pennsylvania.

Early life and education

Cessna was born in Bedford County, Pennsylvania. He  attended the common schools and Hall’s Military Academy in Bedford. Cessna graduated from Marshall College in Mercersburg, Pennsylvania, in 1842. He taught school, studied law, was admitted to the bar in 1845 and commenced practice in Bedford.

Political activities

Democratic service
Cessna served as member of the Pennsylvania State House of Representatives in 1850, 1851, 1862, and 1863, and served as speaker of the house in 1850 and 1863. He was a delegate to the Democratic National Convention at Cincinnati, Ohio, in 1856 and at Charleston, South Carolina, and Baltimore, Maryland, in 1860.

Republican service
Cessna became affiliated with the Republican Party in 1863, and served as chairman of the Republican State convention in 1865. Cessna was elected chairman of the Republican State central committee in 1865. Cessna was a delegate to the Republican National Conventions in 1868, 1876, and 1880.

United States House of Representatives
Cessna was elected as a Republican to the Forty-first Congress. He was an unsuccessful candidate for reelection in 1870. Cessna was elected to the Forty-third Congress. Cessna was not a candidate for renomination in 1874. Cessna was again a member of the State House of Representatives in 1892. Cessna resumed the practice of law in Bedford where he died in 1893.

See also
 Speaker of the Pennsylvania House of Representatives

Sources

The Political Graveyard

1821 births
1893 deaths
People from Bedford County, Pennsylvania
Speakers of the Pennsylvania House of Representatives
Democratic Party members of the Pennsylvania House of Representatives
Mercersburg Academy alumni
Republican Party members of the United States House of Representatives from Pennsylvania
19th-century American politicians